General Sir George Colt Langley,  (8 November 1810 – 28 December 1896) was a Royal Marines officer who served as Deputy Adjutant-General Royal Marines.

Military career
Langley was born in Bristol, the eighth of 12 children born to John Langley and Annabella Claringbold.

Educated at Adams' Grammar School, Langley was commissioned into the Royal Marine Light Infantry. He commanded a detachment of marines off the coast of Spain during the First Carlist War. He became Assistant Adjutant-General at Headquarters Royal Marine Forces in December 1854 and Deputy Adjutant-General Royal Marines (the professional head of the Royal Marines) in January 1862 before retiring in July 1867.

Personal life

His wife Maria Catherine Langley died in 1887 at the age of 66, their eldest son Lionel died in India in 1890 at the age of 40.

References

 

1810 births
1896 deaths
Royal Marines generals
Knights Commander of the Order of the Bath
Military personnel of the First Carlist War
Military personnel from Bristol